This is a partial listing of alumni, teachers and Fellows of the Royal College of Music, London.

Alumni and faculty
Further former students can be found at :Category:Alumni of the Royal College of Music.
Further former and present teachers can be found at :Category:Academics of the Royal College of Music.

Richard Addinsell (1904–1977), composer
Tokio Myers (born 1984), pianist
Richard Adeney (1920–2010), flautist
Sir Thomas Allen (born 1944), singer
Julian Anderson (born 1967), composer
Richard Arnell (1917–2009), composer
Sir Malcolm Arnold (1921–2006), composer
Alexander Baillie (born 1956), cellist
Evelyn Barbirolli (1911–2008), oboist
Peter Bassano (born 1945), trombonist, conductor
John S. Beckett (1927–2007), composer, performer and conductor
Luke Bedford (born 1978), composer
Adrian Beers (1923–2004), double bass player 
Derek Bell (1935–2002), composer, harpist, and pianist
James Bernard (1925–2001), composer
John Birch (born 1929), organist
Roger Birnstingl, bassoonist
Robin Blaze (born 1970), countertenor
Sir Arthur Bliss (1891–1975), composer
Rutland Boughton (1878–1960), composer
Julian Bream (1933–2020), guitarist and lutenist
Frank Bridge (1879–1941), composer
Benjamin Britten (1913–1976), composer
Sheila Bromberg (1928-2021), harpist
Rachel Brown (living), flautist
Timothy Brown (living), hornist
Aylmer Buesst (1883–1970), conductor
Steve Burke (born 1974), video game composer and sound designer
George Butterworth (1885–1916), composer
Clive Carey (1883–1968), baritone, opera producer, composer and folk-song collector
Ronald Cavaye (born 1951), pianist and writer
Otie Chew Becker (1880–1953), violinist
Samuel Coleridge-Taylor  (1875–1912), composer
Sarah Connolly (born 1963), mezzo-soprano
David Cordier (born 1959), countertenor
Charles Daniels (born 1962), tenor
Thurston Dart (1921–1971), performer and musicologist
Ray Davies (1927–2017), trumpeter and bandleader
Sir Andrew Davis (born 1944), conductor
Sir Colin Davis (1927–2013) conductor
Alexandre Desplat (born 1961), film composer
Margaret Douglas-Home (1906–1996), pianist
Julius Drake (born 1959), pianist and accompanist
Madeleine Dring (1923–1977), 1945 ARCM (Piano), composer
Daniel Elms (born 1985), composer
David Fanshawe (1942–2010), composer and ethnomusicologist
Michael Finnissy (born 1946), composer
Leonard N. Fowles (1870–1939), composer, organist and choirmaster
Sarah Fox (born 1973), soprano
Herbert Fryer (1877–1957), pianist
Megumi Fujita of the Fujita Piano Trio
Sir James Galway (born 1939), flautist
Bernard Garfield (born 1924), bassoonist and composer
Noel Gay (1898–1954), songwriter
Jane Glover (born 1949), conductor
Walter Glynne (1890-1945), operatic tenor 
Robert John Godfrey (born 1947), composer and pianist
Malcolm Goldring oboist, conductor
Sir Eugene Goossens (1893–1962), conductor
Léon Goossens (1897–1988), oboist
Sir Charles Groves (1915–1992), conductor
Douglas Guest (1916–1996), organist and choirmaster
Richard Harvey (born 1953), composer and multi-instrumentalist
David Helfgott (born 1947), pianist
Naftali Hershtik (born 1960), cantor
Kenneth Hesketh (born 1968), composer
Georgette Heyer (1902–1974), historical novelist
Gustav Holst (1874–1934), composer
James Horner (1953–2015), composer
Jeremy Dale Roberts (1934–2017), composer
Josef Horovitz (born 1926), composer
Herbert Howells (1892–1983), composer
Owain Arwel Hughes (born 1942), conductor
Walter Hyde (1875–1951), operatic tenor
William Hurlstone (1876–1906), composer
John Ireland (1879–1962), composer and pianist
Gordon Jacob (1895–1984), composer
Georges Jacobi (1840–1906), composer and conductor 
Olga Jegunova (born 1984), pianist
Dame Gwyneth Jones (born 1936), Wagnerian soprano
Bryan Kelly (born 1934), composer
Hannah Kendall (born 1985), composer
Dame Thea King (1925–2007), clarinetist
Constant Lambert (1905–1951), composer and critic
Gabrielle Lambrick (1913–1968), educator and historian
George-Emmanuel Lazaridis (born 1978), pianist
Rowland Lee (born 1960), composer, pianist and music arranger
John Lill (born 1944), pianist
Roger Lord (1924–2014), oboist with London Symphony Orchestra
Natalia Luis-Bassa (born 1966), conductor
David Lyn (1927–2012), actor
Neville Marriner (born 1924), conductor
Colin Mawby (1936–2019), organist, choral conductor and composer
Sir William McKie (1901–1984), organist and choir director
Andrew March (born 1973), composer
Susan Milan (born 1940), flautist
Carlos Miranda (born 1945), composer
Francis Monkman (born 1949), rock, classical and film-score composer
Ludovic Morlot (born 1974), conductor
David Moule-Evans (1905–1988), composer
Stuart Nicholson (born 1975), organist
Steve Nieve (born 1958), keyboardist
Aydin Önaç (born c. 1950), pianist, teacher, headteacher
Sir Hubert Parry (1848–1918), composer
Ian Partridge (born 1938), tenor
Peter Pears (1910–1986), singer
Kevin Penkin (born 1992), anime and video game composer
"Mika" Michael Penniman (born 1983), popular singer-songwriter
Trevor Pinnock (born 1946), harpsichordist and conductor
Clement Power (born 1980), conductor
Julie Price (born 1963), bassoonist
Surendran Reddy (1962–2010), composer and pianist
Achille Rivarde (1865–1940), violinist and teacher
Clara Rodríguez (born 1970), student and teaching professor.
Bernard Rose (1916–1996), academic, Organist and Master of the Choristers, Magdalen College, Oxford
Gilbert Rowland (born 1946), harpsichordist
Isyana Sarasvati (born 1993), singer and songwriter
Malcolm Sargent (1895–1967), conductor
Paul Schwartz (born 1956), producer, composer, conductor and pianist
Howard Shelley (born 1950), pianist
Cyril Smith (1909–1974), pianist
Philip Sparke (born 1951) composer and conductor
Edna Stern (born 1977), pianist
Maxim Vengerov (born 1974), Russian-born Israeli violinist, violist, and conductor
Charles Villiers Stanford (1852–1924), composer
Sophie Viney (born 1974), composer, arranger and pianist
Albert Visetti (1846–1928), composer, conductor and teacher
Leopold Stokowski (1882–1977), conductor
Joan Sutherland (1926–2010), singer
Christopher Tin (born 1976), composer
Michael Tippett (1905–1998), composer
Mark-Anthony Turnage (born 1960), composer
Nick van Bloss (born 1967), pianist and author
Vanessa-Mae (born 1978), violinist
Rick Wakeman (born 1949), keyboardist
Bernard Walton (1917–1972), clarinetist
William Waterhouse (1931–2007), bassoonist and musicologist
Fanny Waterman (1920–2020), founding director of the Leeds International Pianoforte Competition
Darryl Way (born 1948), rock and classical musician
Andrew Lloyd Webber (born 1948), composer
Julian Lloyd Webber (born 1951), cellist
William Lloyd Webber (1914–1982), organist and composer
Laura Wright (born 1990), singer
Gillian Weir (born 1941), organist
Grace Williams (1906–1977), composer
John Williams (born 1941), guitarist
Ralph Vaughan Williams (1872–1958), composer
Martin Yates (born 1958), conductor

Isyana Sarasvati (born 1994), singer-songwriter

Fellows

Royal College of Music